Rowland Williams may refer to:

Rowland Williams (cleric) (1779–1854), Welsh Anglican clergyman and father of the theologian of the same name
Rowland Williams (theologian) (1817–1870), Welsh theologian and academic at St David's College, Lampeter
Rowland Williams (Hwfa Môn) (1823–1905), Welsh Congregationalist cleric, poet and Archdruid
Rowland Powell-Williams (1872–1951), English cricketer, was born as 'Rowland Williams but changed his name in 1900

See also
Roland Williams (born 1975), American football player